Leipzig is the most populous city in Saxony, Germany.

Leipzig may also refer to:
Leipzig (Bezirk), a district of East Germany encompassing the German city
Leipzig (district), a district near the German city
Leipzig (region), a former subdivision of Saxony
Leipzig, Saskatchewan, a hamlet in Canada
RB Leipzig, an association football team based in Leipzig, Germany
Battle of Leipzig, a major battle in the Napoleonic Wars
Leipzig: The Battle of Nations, a 1972 wargame that simulates Napoleon's 1813 campaigns including the Battle of Leipzig

See also

Leipsic (disambiguation)
Leipzig Airport (disambiguation)
Leipzig School (disambiguation)